The Secret was released on 19 December 2007, and is Marie Picasso's debut album.

Track listing
Winning Streak     
Good Thing        
Earth And Sky          
This Moment     
Miracle     
Romeo     
Out of My Hands     
Weak
It's Over Now     
I'll Be There

Chart positions

References 

2007 debut albums
Marie Picasso albums
Sony BMG albums